Battle for the Sun is the sixth studio album by British alternative rock band Placebo. It was recorded in Canada in 2008 and released on 8 June 2009 by record label PIAS. It is their first album with new drummer Steve Forrest, following the departure of Steve Hewitt in 2007.

Battle for the Sun reached number 8 in the UK Albums Chart, and received a generally favourable reaction from critics. Four singles were released from the album: "For What It's Worth", "The Never-Ending Why", "Ashtray Heart" and "Bright Lights".

Production
David Bottrill produced the record, after having previously worked with Tool, Muse, Silverchair, Remy Zero, and dEUS. James Brown, who worked on the band's 2006 album Meds, engineered. It is also the first album with the new drummer, Steve Forrest. Recording took place at Metalworks Studios, Mississauga, Ontario.

On Battle for the Sun, the band utilize new instruments, such as trumpets and saxophones. Molko even experimented with the Springtime (experimental electric guitar made by Yuri Landman).

Content
The material on the album has influences from such bands as PJ Harvey and My Bloody Valentine.

Frontman Brian Molko said on the concept of the album:
We've made a record about choosing life, about choosing to live, about stepping out of the darkness and into the light. Not necessarily turning your back on the darkness because it's there, it's essential; it's a part of who you are, but more about the choice of standing in the sunlight instead.

Molko has also stated that Battle for the Sun is the band's first album with a discernible thematic unity. Molko states that his favourite track from the album is "Speak in Tongues".

Molko was inspired to write bonus track "Unisex" by the movie Cloverfield.

The mastered album features a slight peculiarity on track 9 ("Julien"): the vocals are doubled for a short duration, with a phrase, sung in low volume, preceding itself. Such artifacts can stem from a variety of sources such as production errors, or from encoding within the .mp3 or .mp4 formats, both of which suffer from just such a flaw.

Release
The title track debuted on Zane Lowe's BBC Radio 1 show 17 March 2009. After the world première, it became available for free download on the band's official site. At an exclusive secret gig held on 17 March 2009, in London, the band played a number of new songs from the album, including the tracks "Ashtray Heart", "Julien", "Kitty Litter", and "Devil in the Details". They also covered Nik Kershaw's "Wouldn't It Be Good". The album was made available for streaming on the band's official website between 29 May and 31 May 2009.

Battle for the Sun was released on 8 June 2009 as a download, CD, limited edition CD and DVD, LP, and a limited edition box set. It reached number 8 in the UK Albums Chart. Its debut in US marked 10,000 copies sold, and worldwide shipments were 500,000 copies worldwide.

In 2009. It was awarded a diamond certification from the Independent Music Companies Association which indicated sales of at least 250,000 copies throughout Europe.

The box set features the full album plus two extra studio tracks, a CD to access exclusive live recorded tracks, a DVD of the December 2008 Angkor Wat performance, a DVD of exclusive studio footage and a 32-page photo book featuring exclusive artwork, photos and handwritten lyrics as well as the full album on 2 x Heavy Vinyl LP.

Critical reception

Battle for the Sun received a generally favourable reaction from critics. Eddie Fleisher of Alternative Press gave the album 4 and a half out of 5 stars, writing that Battle for the Sun "takes the best elements of their sound and focuses it into a cohesive listening experience ... there's no filler to be found". The review also notes how Steve Forrest as drummer gives the band a much-needed kick and how Brian Molko's lyrics are given more clarity. Fleisher also says the album contains two of the best Placebo songs ever, "Happy You're Gone" and "Kings of Medicine".

Others, however, have been less than receptive. NME said that Battle for the Sun was "a desperately transparent copy of originality. For those who still believe in them, Placebo will, at least, remain an efficacious live band at festivals this summer, but only given that the real thing (Suede, Muse, David Bowie, Nirvana et al) isn't currently on offer." Rolling Stone added that "too many songs ("Devil in the Details") are full of bombast and bland angst, as if these smart guys know better but can't help themselves".

Track listing

 Deluxe Edition bonus DVD 1 Live at Angkor Wat
"Meds" – 5:23
"Because I Want You" – 4:23
"Follow the Cops Back Home" – 4:52
"Black-Eyed" – 3:14
"Post Blue" – 3:55
"Blind" – 4:15
"Drag" – 3:39
"Teenage Angst" – 3:19
"Twenty Years" – 4:55
Detour documentary

 Deluxe Edition bonus DVD 2
In the Studio: The Making of Battle for the Sun documentary

Personnel
 Placebo
Brian Molko – vocals, guitar, Springtime guitar, keyboards, piano
Stefan Olsdal – bass guitar, guitar, keyboards, piano, organ, backing vocals
Steve Forrest – drums, percussion, backing vocals

 Additional personnel
Bill Lloyd – keyboards
Fiona Brice – string arrangements
Peter Cardinalli – brass arrangements
Alex Cooksey – keyboards, piano, backing vocals
Hazel Fernandes – backing vocals
Valerie Etienne – backing vocals

 Technical
David Bottrill – production
James Brown – engineering
Wayne Cochrane – engineering assistance (tracking)
Kevin Dietz – engineering (recording)
Alan Moulder – mixing
Darren Lawson – mixing assistance
John Davis – mastering
Joseph Llanes – sleeve photography
Tim Young – Redux Edition remastering

Charts

Weekly charts

Year-end charts

Certifications

Release history

References

External links

https://open.spotify.com/album/0sbdMEPj1M3UG2gfKclNbo?si=4UvETKIWSv2ghKJxwW0XFQ
http://www.deezer.com/album/9609398

2009 albums
Placebo (band) albums
PIAS Recordings albums
Albums produced by David Bottrill
Albums recorded at Metalworks Studios